Francisco H.L. Ou (5 January 1940 – 30 October 2021) was a Taiwanese diplomat. He was ambassador of the Republic of China to Nicaragua and Guatemala before serving as foreign minister during the Ma Ying-jeou presidential administration.

Early life
Ou was born in Hsinchu, Taiwan, and raised in Hualien. His father was arrested during the February 28 Incident in 1947. He and his family lived in poverty during his younger days. Ou received his BA from National Chengchi University in 1962.

Political career
Upon graduation, he then went on to serve in the government in several diplomatic capacities, mostly with Central and South American nations. He was also the Spanish interpreter for late President Chiang Kai-shek and Chiang Ching-Kuo. Ou served as Embassy secretary to Peru (1967–71), ambassador to Nicaragua (1984–85) and Guatemala (1990–96, 2003-8). He has also been director of the Far East Commercial Office in Santiago, Chile (1975-1981), director of the Taiwan Commercial Office in Argentina (1986–90) and representative for the Taiwan Economic and Cultural Office in Spain (2000–03).

ROC Foreign Ministry

Foreign ministry appointment
Ou had planned to retire after turning 65 and applied for permanent residency (‘green card’) in the United States of America. Although he had not expected to be tapped as Foreign Minister when Ma Ying-jeou formed his new government in 2008, Ou accepted Ma's offer. He immediately gave up his green card upon accepting his new post. His possession of a green card generated minor controversy in Taiwanese circles as many viewed the possession of extra-Taiwan status (citizenship or even a green card) as being unpatriotic. Ou, however, claimed that he was merely planning for his retirement, for most of his family members live in the US, and applied for a green card out of realistic thinking.

Foreign ministry resignation
Ou resigned from his post effective 10 September 2009, along with outgoing Premier Liu Chao-Shiuan and the rest of the Cabinet in a reshuffling of government, mostly due to the slow government response handling the Typhoon Morakot aftermath. He was replaced by Timothy Yang, formerly the Republic of China's representative to Indonesia.

Personal life
Ou was fluent in Taiwanese, Mandarin Chinese, English, French, and Spanish. He was also an avid table tennis player.

Ou reportedly underwent surgery in August 2021, and was hospitalized before his death on 30 October 2021, aged 81.

References

External links

 Ministry of Foreign Affairs 
 

1940 births
2021 deaths
People from Hsinchu
Taiwanese Ministers of Foreign Affairs
Politicians of the Republic of China on Taiwan from Taoyuan City
National Chengchi University alumni
Ambassadors of the Republic of China to Guatemala
Ambassadors of the Republic of China to Nicaragua
Representatives of Taiwan to Argentina
Representatives of Taiwan to Chile
Representatives of Taiwan to Spain